Kandyman (born Ruben Cuesta Palomo) is a popular Cuban reggaeton (cubatón) singer.

Career 
Born in Santiago de Cuba, he grew up listening to Jamaican radio, and thus reggae music. He was one of the first artists to use the Jamaican dancehall and ragga musical styles in his compositions, thus creating the first unique cubatón sound in the early 2000s.

He is now considered as one of the leaders of the scene. He has a long standing collaboration with Sweden-based cubatón label Topaz Records, and has gained fame across the Americas and Europe in the genre.

Now in 2019 he has rebranded his name from Candyman to Kandyman and has new releases upcoming under Kobalt Music Group

Discography

Songs
 "La Cosita"
 "Bayu Baye"
 "Ponte a la moda"
 "Cuando tú me besas"
 "Que se acabe"

External links
 Official Instagram

References

Cuban male singers
Cuban reggaeton musicians
People from Santiago de Cuba
Living people
Year of birth missing (living people)